St Martin's School is a coeducational secondary school and sixth form with academy status, located in the Hutton area of Brentwood, Essex, England.

It used to be a separate boys and girls school but these were combined in the 1970s to make one co-educational school on the same site. The school is named after Saint Martin who was a Roman soldier who performed a miracle. The school converted to academy status on 1 July 2011.

Notable former pupils
Nicola Juniper, professional cyclist

See also
List of secondary schools in Essex

References

External links
School website

Borough of Brentwood
Secondary schools in Essex
Academies in Essex
Educational institutions established in 2011
2011 establishments in England